Yinghuo-1 was a Chinese Mars-exploration space probe, intended to be the first Chinese planetary space probe and the first Chinese spacecraft to orbit Mars. It was launched from Baikonur Cosmodrome, Kazakhstan, on 8 November 2011, along with the Russian Fobos-Grunt sample return spacecraft, which was intended to visit Mars' moon Phobos. The 115-kg (250-lb) Yinghuo-1 probe was intended by the CNSA to orbit Mars for about two years, studying the planet's surface, atmosphere, ionosphere and magnetic field. Shortly after launch, Fobos-Grunt was expected to perform two burns to depart Earth orbit bound for Mars. However, these burns did not take place, leaving both probes stranded in orbit. On 17 November 2011, CNSA reported that Yinghuo-1 had been declared lost. After a period of orbital decay, Yinghuo-1 and Fobos-Grunt underwent destructive re-entry on 15 January 2012, finally disintegrating over the Pacific Ocean.

As a result, CNSA subsequently moved to embark on an independent Mars exploration program, which culminated in the Tianwen-1 orbiter-lander-rover mission that successfully landed the Zhurong rover on Mars on 22 May, 2021.

Name
Yinghuo-1's name ( – firefly, literally "luminous fire") was a tribute to the near-homophone yinghuo. This word, a short form of "shimmering planet" (熒惑星), is an ancient Chinese name for Mars.

Background
On 26 March 2007, the director of the China National Space Administration, Sun Laiyan, and the head of the Russian Space Agency, Anatoly Perminov, signed a landmark space co-operation accord, entitled the "Cooperative Agreement between the China National Space Administration and the Russian Space Agency on joint Chinese-Russian exploration of Mars". One stipulation of the agreement was the construction and launch of the Yinghuo Mars orbiter and its Russian counterpart, Fobos-Grunt.

Instruments and objectives
Yinghuo-1's primary scientific objectives were:
 To conduct detailed investigation of the plasma environment and magnetic field around Mars.
 To study Martian ion escape processes and their possible mechanisms
 To conduct ionosphere occultation measurements between Yinghuo-1 and Fobos-Grunt, focusing on the sub-solar and midnight regions.
 To observe sandstorms on the Martian surface.

The probe's science payload consisted of four instrument:

 A plasma package, consisting of an electron analyzer, ion analyzer and mass spectrometer.
 A fluxgate magnetometer.
 A radio-occultation sounder.
 An optical imaging system consisting of two cameras with  resolution for high-quality images of the Martian surface to be captured from orbit.

Mission profile

Following its transit to Mars, Yinghuo-1 was planned to separate from Fobos-Grunt in October 2012 and enter a 72.8-hour equatorial Martian orbit, with an orbital inclination of approximately 5 degrees. Fobos-Grunt and Yinghuo-1 would have conducted Mars ionosphere occultation experiments together, although Fobos-Grunt's primary objective was to obtain surface samples from the Martian moon Phobos. Yinghuo-1 would have experienced periods of up to 8.8 hours in darkness when its orbit carried it over Mars' nightside; it would have run on battery power during these periods, as its solar panels would have been unusable without direct sunlight.

Launch processing
On 17 October 2011, the completed Yinghuo-1 satellite arrived at Baikonur Cosmodrome with Fobos-Grunt, beginning payload processing operations in preparation for its November launch.

Launch and orbital burn failure
China's Yinghuo-1 and the Russian Fobos-Grunt spacecraft were launched together aboard a Ukrainian Zenit rocket with a Fregat upper stage from Baikonur Cosmodrome, Kazakhstan, on 8 November 2011. Shortly after launch, Fobos-Grunt was expected to perform two burns to depart Earth orbit and begin its journey to Mars. However, these burns did not take place, stranding the two spacecraft in their parking orbit. Despite repeated efforts to contact the launcher and rectify the problem, the spacecraft continued to lose altitude. On 17 November, Chinese state media formally declared the Yinghuo-1 probe lost, and the launcher's orbit gradually began to decay.

Destructive re-entry
On 14 January 2012, it was reported that Fobos-Grunt and Yinghuo-1 were beginning their final descent into Earth's atmosphere, falling at a rate of several hundred metres per hour from their  orbital altitude. The two spacecraft completed their re-entry and disintegrated over the Pacific Ocean on 15 January 2012.

Specifications
Length:  (excluding solar panels).
Width: .
Height: .
Mass: .
HGA: 950 mm antenna dish (S-band) with a 12 W transmitter in two frequencies (8.4 and 7.17 GHz) and a data rate between 8 bit/s and 16 kbit/s.
LGA: 80 bit/s data rate.

See also

References

Further reading

External links
Fobos-Grunt at Spacefiles.com . Includes an image of Yinghuo-1.

2011 in China
Space probes launched in 2011
Chinese space probes
Missions to Mars
Fobos-Grunt
Spacecraft which reentered in 2012
Attached spacecraft
Destroyed space probes